The 1980 United States presidential election in Louisiana took place on November 4, 1980. All 50 states and The District of Columbia were part of the 1980 United States presidential election. State voters chose ten electors to the Electoral College, who voted for president and vice president.

Louisiana was won by former California Governor Ronald Reagan (R) by 5.45 percentage points. , this is the last election in which Livingston Parish and Beauregard Parish voted for a Democratic presidential candidate.

Results

Results by parish

See also
 United States presidential elections in Louisiana

References

Louisiana
1980
1980 Louisiana elections